is a Japanese astronomer and entomologist. He discovered the periodic comet 98P/Takamizawa. He has discovered many asteroids, including 8720 Takamizawa which is named after him.

Awards
 Seven Discovery Awards, the Astronomical Society of Japan (ASJ)
 Three Distinguished Service Awards, ASJ (1987, 1989, 1997)

Publications

References

20th-century Japanese astronomers
Living people
Year of birth missing (living people)